Country Hall of Fame is a studio album by American country singer–songwriter Hank Locklin. It was released in February 1968 via RCA Victor Records and contained 12 tracks. The album was co-produced by Chet Atkins and Felton Jarvis. The album's name was derived from its single of the same, which became Locklin's first major hit in several years. It would also be his seventeenth studio recording released in his career and one of many to be produced by Chet Atkins. Country Hall of Fame received positive reviews from writers and publications.

Background and content
Hank Locklin had not had a major hit single since the early 1960s when songs like "Please Help Me, I'm Falling" reached the top of the country charts. Yet, he continued releasing studio albums, other top 40 hits and toured. In 1968, Locklin's single that paid tribute to the Country Music Hall of Fame and Museum became his first to reach the top ten in many years. Its success prompted the recording (and release) of a studio album of the same name. 

The album was a collection of 12 tracks. Despite being a songwriter as well, none of the album's material was composed by Locklin. Instead, it featured songs first recorded by other artists and songs written by other composers. Included was covers like Hank Williams' "Lovesick Blues," Jim Reeves' "Four Walls" and "High Noon." All of the album's songs paid homage to country artists (mostly whom Locklin was influenced by) who been inducted into the Country Music Hall of Fame and Museum. The project was recorded in November 1967 at the RCA Victor Nashville Sound Studio, located in Nashville, Tennessee. The sessions were co-produced by Chet Atkins (Locklin's producer of many years) and Felton Jarvis.

Release and reception

The album's release was preceded by its title track, which was first released as a single in September 1967. Spending 20 weeks on the Billboard Hot Country Songs chart, the single would climb to number eight in January 1968. The title track brought Locklin's his first top ten hit since 1962's "Happy Journey," prompting the release of the studio album. The album was first released in February 1968 on RCA Victor Records. It would mark Locklin's seventeenth studio album. It was originally distributed as a vinyl LP, containing six songs on each side. Several decades later, it was re-released in a digital format to online music stores such as Apple Music.

Country Hall of Fame entered the Billboard Top Country Albums chart following its release and spent a total of 20 weeks there. By April of that year, it reached a peak of 20. It would be Locklin's highest-charting Billboard album. Following its original release, the record received positive responses from music publications and critics. Billboard magazine responded positively to it in their March 1968 issue. They highlighted the album's covers of various country songs, but called its title track "the key song of the LP." Thom Owens of Allmusic would later rate the album four and a half stars. "It's a very entertaining and even moving record, and it ranks as one of his best albums of the late '60s," he commented.

Track listings

Vinyl version

Digital version

Personnel
All credits are adapted from the liner notes of Country Hall of Fame.

Musical personnel
 The A Strings – string section
 Chet Atkins – guitar
 Harold Bradley – guitar
 Jerry Carrigan – drums
 Floyd Cramer – piano
 Ray Edenton – guitar
 The Jordanaires – background vocals
 Hank Locklin – lead vocals
 Grady Martin – guitar
 Wayne Moss – guitar
 The Nashville Edition – background vocals
 Jerry Reed – guitar
 Hargus "Pig" Robbins – piano
 Jerry Smith – piano
 Pete Wade – guitar
 Bill Walker – vibes

Technical personnel
 Chet Atkins – producer
 Felton Jarvis – producer
 Bill McElhiney – arrangements

Chart performance

Release history

References

1968 albums
Albums produced by Chet Atkins
Albums produced by Felton Jarvis
Hank Locklin albums
RCA Victor albums